Hi ho may refer to:
"Hi ho", refrain in novel Slapstick
Hi Ho Crackers, snack cracker
"Hi-Ho/Good Bye", single by Japanese musician hide
Hi-Hoe or NOTS-EV-2 Caleb, expendable launch system

See also
"Heigh-Ho", song from Walt Disney's Snow White and the Seven Dwarfs